The 1979–80 Midland Football League was the 80th in the history of the Midland Football League, a football competition in England.

Premier Division

The Premier Division featured 18 clubs which competed in the previous season, no new clubs joined the division this season.

League table

Division One

Division One featured 12 clubs which competed in the previous season, along with four new clubs:
Borrowash Victoria, joined from the East Midlands Regional League
Retford Rail
Rolls Royce (Hucknall)
Sutton Trinity

League table

References

Midland Football League (1889)
8